Iman Meskini (born 3 March 1997) is a Norwegian actress. She is best known for playing the role of Sana Bakkoush in the teen drama series Skam.

Personal life
Meskini grew up in the village of Langhus and identifies as a practicing Muslim. Her mother is from Norway and her father is from Tunisia. She played as a guard for the Høybråten Basketball Club during the 2016–2017 year.  In 2016, Meskini majored in Arabic and Middle Eastern studies at the University of Oslo.  She currently works with Norway's Air Forces. On 12 June 2019, Meskini married Mourad Jarrari from Morocco.

Skam
Meskini became known for her role as Sana Bakkoush from Julie Andem's teen web series's Skam, which is broadcast on NRK. Her character status was recurring from seasons 1–3, then later turned to lead in season 4.

Reception
Since her first appearance on Skam, and especially since the show's fourth season, in which she served as the primary lead, Sana has gathered an incredible number of fans. In addition to Sana's popularity, Meskini has been praised for her portrayal of the character and her outstanding representation of Muslim youth within Western societies, but especially female Muslim teenagers living in Norway.

Sana's appearance and portrayal on a show as popular as Skam at a time which saw a rise in Islamophobia across the globe was marked by many as essential in challenging stereotypes of hijab-wearing Muslim women and provided non-Muslim Norwegians with an alternative representation of their Muslim neighbours.

Other projects
She also starred in B4 (2018) and Pørni (2021).

External links

References

1997 births
Living people
Norwegian people of Tunisian descent
University of Oslo alumni
21st-century Norwegian actresses
Norwegian television actresses
Norwegian Muslims
People from Kolbotn